The Demolitionist is a 1995 American superhero film directed by Robert Kurtzman. The film stars Nicole Eggert, Richard Grieco, Bruce Abbott, Heather Langenkamp, Susan Tyrrell and Tom Savini.

Plot 
A murdered female police officer is brought back to life by a cold-hearted scientist to serve as "The Demolitionist", the ultimate crime-fighting weapon in a city overrun by criminals and internal corruption.

Cast 

 Nicole Eggert as Alyssa Lloyd
 Richard Grieco as "Mad Dog" Burne
 Bruce Abbott as Professor Jack Crowley
 Heather Langenkamp as Christy Carruthers
 Andras Jones as Daniel Dupre
 Susan Tyrrell as Mayor Eleanor Grimbaum
 Peter Jason as Chief Higgins
 Sarah Douglas as The Surgeon
 Tom Savini as Roland
 Jack Nance as Father McKenzie
 Randy Vasquez as Henry "Little Henry" Burne
 Chris Cowell as The Executioner
 Joseph Pilato as "Boxer"
 Reggie Bannister as Warden Thomas
 Dan Hicks as Krutchfield
 Bob Hurst as Duffy
 Niles Allen Stewart as 'Hammerhead'
 David Anthony Marshall as "One Eye"
 Andre Rosey Brown as Frank "Big Frank"
 James Mongold as Arlis
 Paul Munoz as "Skin"
 Russ MacGuire as "Ram"
 J. Wolf as "Wolf"
 Brandon Burke as Jermot
 Randy Stafford as "Lipps"
 Derek Mears as Chuck "Chuck X"
 Porter Jamison as "Swamp Rat"
 Walter T. Hubbard as "The Hubb"
 Richard French as J.C.
 Ryan Powley as "Porkchop"
 Armand Medina as Mortay
 Michael Maranda as Otto
 Joelle Sailers as Biker Slut
 Bruce Campbell as Raffle Winner (uncredited)

Release 
The film premiered in Los Angeles on March 10, 1995. It later received a limited theatrical release in May 1996 before debuting on video in July 1996.

Reception 
The film has a 17% approval rating based on 6 reviews on Rotten Tomatoes. Ray Mark Rinaldi of St. Louis Post-Dispatch highlighted the films camp aesthetics, and described the performances as a "cartoon brought to life." Glenn Kenny of EW praised the film for its "low budget charm". Lorry Kikta of Film Threat praised the action sequences, costume design, and dialogue. She also highlighted the performances of Susan Tyrell and Richard Grieco. In contrast, TV Guide panned the movie, commenting that it was obviously inspired by RoboCop, but lacked the "inspiration's satiric viewpoint, or enough of a budget to create any memorable action scenes."

References

External links
 
 

1995 films
1995 horror films
American action horror films
American independent films
Superhero horror films
Films set in 1995
1995 independent films
American science fiction action films
American films about revenge
Cyborg films
American exploitation films
Films directed by Robert Kurtzman
1990s English-language films
1990s American films